L'Étoile du soldat is a French film by the director Christophe de Ponfilly, who made several movies and documentaries in Afghanistan. The film was released after his suicide in 2006.

Synopsis 
The film retraces the steps of a Russian guitarist, Nikolaï, from a town outside Moscow. He has a poor relationship with his parents and when Nikolaï is drafted into the Russian army and sent to the 1980s Soviet–Afghan War, his father thinks this will make him into a real man.

We are then shown how the Russian forces have established a base in a remote valley, from where they are trying to root out Mujahideen rebels fighting the Russian-backed regime in Kabul. The new Russian recruits are unprepared and unsure why and who they are fighting. Nikolaï witnesses an ugly incident where a Russian soldier tries to rape an Afghan woman, but she stabs and kills him. Torn in his loyalties, he motions for the woman to escape from his fellow Russian conscripts surrounding the village, since they would certainly have killed her for her actions.

Nikolaï is later captured as a prisoner of war by the Mujahideen. In captivity he is initially scared, and his captors are hostile to this foreigner, who is a symbol of the invasion. But he gradually forges a bond with Commander Massoud of the Mujahideen, questions his own identity, and relates more with the rebel forces than with the Russian troops that constantly attack Afghan homes and villages with tanks and helicopters.

Later in the film, after a young girl, Massoud's niece, tells the Commander of Nikolaï's bravery in allowing the woman to flee and thus sparing her life, he gains the respect of the rebels and is set free. A French war photographer, Vergos (played by the real life war observer Patrick Chauvel), also features in the story. He is also a foreigner in Afghanistan accompanying the rebel forces to document their struggle, which was taking place before satellite communication and thus was largely concealed from international scrutiny. Nikolaï and Vergos establish a friendship, and the two of them escape to Pakistan, with a promise from Vergos that he will take Nikolaï to France. We are led to believe that the pair will reveal to the world the extent of brutality in the war. The film ends with them staring out to the border, with a 10-hour walk ahead of them. A postscript tells us that Nikolaï was later killed in an ambush in Pakistan. A brief image reminds us that the film is based on a true story of a Russian conscript who changed sides after his capture.

Vergos, back in Afghanistan in 2001, looks back on events in the early 1980s. He ruminates on how CIA/American support for the Mujahideen against the Russian-backed regime at that time had the unforeseen outcome of creating more radical Islam. The events in the movie are, therefore, a 'flashback' from 2001 to 1983, and an indictment of ill-advised meddling by both the US and Russia.

Production details
The film was shot in Afghanistan in rural and remote regions in August and September 2005, and October 2005 in Russia. Most scenes are high in the mountains with spectacular vistas, and use many local actors. The writer, Christian Kracht, has a short cameo appearance as a Red Army soldier.

There is a graphic novel version of the story published by Casterman, drawn by René Follet.

Details 
 Title: L'étoile du soldat
 Director: Christophe de Ponfilly
 Script: Christophe de Ponfilly, Rim Turki
 Director of photography: Laurent Fleutot, Didier Portal
 Sound: Alain Curvelier, Stéphane Albinet
 Film: Anja Lüdcke
 Music: Jean-Baptiste Loussier
 Production: Albert Films
 Co-Production: NEF Filmproduktion und vertriebs GmbH, AFGHAN FILM, FRANCE 2 CINEMA, EuroArts Medien GmbH
 Distribution: Les Films du Losange
 Country of origin: France
 Format: 35 mm (1:85) – super 16 mm DVHD
 Visa: 112944
 Genre: Documentary fiction
 Length: 1 H 45
 Date: 22
 Budget 3.4 million euros (assistance of E360,000 from Eurimages and E300,000 from Franco-allemandes co-productions.

Cast 
 Sacha Bourdo – Nikolaï
 Patrick Chauvel – Vergos
 Philippe Caubère – Narrator of the French soundtrack
 Hanns Zischler – Narrator of the German soundtrack
 Mohammad Amin – Najmoudine
 Ahmad Shah Alefsourat – Assad
 Gol Gotey – Leïla
 Denis Manohin – Mosgh
 Pavel Kuzin – Lieutenant
 Elena Mikheeva – La mère de Nikolaï
 Serguey Sonovsky – Le père de Nikolaï
 Murad Ibrahim Bekov – Zanoviev
 Akbar Aiqhair – Villager
 Mollah Abdellah Amini – Molla
 Abkar Arqahoui – Baba Leïla
 Saïd Azim – Mollawi
 Brehna Bahar – Attacked woman
 Wazir Bakhashi – Ali
 Pacha Barchak – Leonid
 Abdoul Raffar Daouiri – Villager
 Vladimir Davidenko – Igor
 Hayatullah Elmi – Interpreter
 Gollam Farouk – Nailjik
 Ahmad Faycal – Professor Dari
 Sabour Khanji – Afghan Officer
 Ram Khoda – Old man
 Dimitri Koltsov – Sargeant
 German Magnusov – Boris
 Zabi Nabart – Ara
 Igor Naryshkin – Valovdia
 Ahmad Wali Oqhab
 Evgueny Printsev – Andrey
 Ilia Prossekin – Saratov
 Ariq Sakhi – Commander
 Quiam Sidik
 Nathalia Zhitkova – Tania

Prize
 Best film, festival d'automne de Gardanne, France

References

External links

  Distributor
 

French documentary films
2006 films
Docufiction films
French drama films